Newtown is a town in Fairfield County, Connecticut, United States. It is part of the Greater Danbury metropolitan area as well as the New York metropolitan area. Newtown was founded in 1705, and later incorporated in 1711. As of the 2020 census, its population was 27,173.

History

In 1705, English colonists purchased the Townsite from the Pohtatuck Indians, a branch of the Pasgussett. It was originally known as Quanneapague. Settled by migrants from Stratford and incorporated in 1711, Newtown residents had many business and trading ties with the English. It was a stronghold of Tory sentiment during the early Revolutionary War. Late in the war, French General Rochambeau and his troops encamped there in 1781 during their celebrated march on their way to the siege of Yorktown, Virginia, which ended the Revolution.

An important crossroads throughout its early history, the village of Hawleyville briefly emerged as a railroad center. The town's population grew to over 4,000 . In the following decades, the population dwindled to a low of 2,635 in 1930 before again growing.

Local industry has included the manufacture of furniture, tea bags, combs, fire hoses, folding boxes, buttons, and hats, as well as farming, and mica and feldspar mining. The game of "Scrabble" was developed here by James Brunot.

From the period of highway development and suburbanization following World War II, the town has developed as a suburb of Danbury, with many people also commuting to Norwalk, Stamford, and Bridgeport.

The Newtown Bee

The local newspaper, The Newtown Bee has been the hometown media outlet since June 1877, under Publisher John Pearce of Bethel. The Smith family purchased the newspaper in 1881 and has continuously operated it since that time.

Sandy Hook Elementary School shooting

, Adam Lanza shot and killed his mother in her home and then drove to Sandy Hook Elementary School where he killed 20 children and six adult staff. He committed suicide when police arrived at the school.
Lanza suffered from severe mental illness which was left untreated. The event reignited a debate regarding access to firearms by people with mental illness and gun laws in the United States.

Geography
The northeastern border of the town is a natural border that follows the Housatonic River.

The state's fifth largest town in area, it is bordered by Bethel, Bridgewater, Brookfield, Easton, Monroe, Oxford, Redding and Southbury.

Principal communities
Botsford (ZIP code 06470)
Dodgingtown
Hattertown
Hawleyville (ZIP code 06470)
Newtown Borough (ZIP code 06470)
Rocky Glen
Sandy Hook (ZIP code 06482) (including Berkshire, Riverside, Walnut Tree Hill, and Zoar communities)
Smaller communities include Camelot, Head of Meadow (not necessarily related to Head O'Meadow Elementary School), Hopewell, Huntingtown, Lands End, Middle Gate, Palestine, and Taunton.

Demographics

As of the 2020 census, the total population was 27,179 in 9,934 households. As of the census of 2000, there were 25,031 people, 8,325 households, and 6,776 families residing in the town. The racial makeup of the town was 95.14% White, 1.75% Black or African American, 0.14% Native American, 1.40% Asian, 0.04% Pacific Islander, 0.64% from other races, and 0.89% from two or more races. Hispanic or Latino of any race were 2.36% of the population.

There were 8,325 households, out of which 44.7% had children under the age of 18 living with them, 73.3% were married couples living together, 5.8% had a female householder with no husband present, and 18.6% were non-families. 14.8% of all households were made up of individuals, and 5.8% had someone living alone who was 65 years of age or older. The average household size was 2.90 and the average family size was 3.24.

In the town, the population was spread out, with 29.3% under the age of 18, 4.4% from 18 to 24, 32.5% from 25 to 44, 25.1% from 45 to 64, and 8.7% who were 65 years of age or older. The median age was 38 years. For every 100 females, there were 104.9 males. For every 100 females age 18 and over, there were 103.5 males.

The median income for a household in the town was $90,193, and the median income for a family was $99,192 (these figures had risen to $101,937 and $119,175 respectively as of a 2007 estimate). Males had a median income of $68,965 versus $42,217 for females. The per capita income for the town was $37,786. About 2.2% of families and 3.1% of the population were below the poverty line, including 3.0% of those under age 18 and 3.9% of those age 65 or over.

Parks and recreation
The town of Newtown offers many programs for area residents. Numerous parks and fields offer playgrounds, swimming, tennis, softball, baseball, volleyball, lacrosse, soccer, as well as a nature center and trails. Prominent Newtown parks include Treadwell Park, Dickinson Park, and Collis P. Huntington State Park. Treadwell Park, named after former selectman Timothy Treadwell, contains recreation facilities and the town pool. Dickinson park used to contain a swimming pool, which was a large asphalt-lined bowl-shaped depression surrounded by a grass "beach". It was a uniquely safe design for children because there was no "deep end"; however, it lacked a formal filtration system and required attendants to periodically row out and manually add chlorine to the water. The asphalt was removed and the pond pool filled with earth in 2006.

Government

In Connecticut politics, the town of Newtown is required to have both a Democratic and a Republican Town Committee. The Town Committee members vote on which candidates to endorse for public elections. Elected to a two-year term, the Board of Selectmen supervise the administration of the affairs of the town, except those matters which by the General Statute or Town Charter are exclusively committed to the Board of Education or other departments. They are led by a First Selectman, who is the Chief Executive and Administrative Officer of the town. The Board of Selectmen, with the assistance of the departments and boards and commission, prepares the annual budget for the town in February. The Board of Education prepares and passes an education budget for the town schools at the same time. Both budgets then proceed to the Board of Finance, who reviews the town budget and education budget before being sent to the Legislative Council. The Legislative Council of 12 members (elected to the same two-year terms) acts as the legislative body of the town and has the power to pass ordinances and approve budgets for referendums. Final budget approval is subject to a town-wide referendum. These procedures are set forth in the Town Charter adopted and reviewed by the citizens.

Incorporated in 1824 by an act of the Connecticut General Assembly, it is one of only nine boroughs in the state. The borough adopted zoning for the town center long before the rest of the community. The lot sizes are smaller than the minimum  lots of the rest of the community. The borough also has running public water provided by the Water & Sewer Authority. Much of the borough is sewered, whereas most of the rest of the town have wells and septic systems.

Law enforcement
The Newtown Police Department was founded in 1971.

Landmarks
Newtown has a number of local landmarks. The flagpole, first erected in 1876, now stands in the center of Main Street. Across from the flagpole is Newtown Meeting House, which served as the town's Congregational church for many years. The rooster weather vane (a town symbol), located atop the meeting house, is said to have been used as a target by French soldiers encamped here in 1781 during the Revolutionary War.

Hawley School is a landmark constructed in the 1920s. It has been used as a whole-town school, a high school, and an elementary school, its current function. Though it has served many different school functions, its original section has remained much the same. Two additions have been added.

Newtown is the site of Fairfield Hills Hospital, a state psychiatric hospital constructed in the 1930s and closed in 1995. The hospital was used as the set of the juvenile facility in the film Sleepers in 1995. In 2004, Newtown purchased the property and, as of 2007, was considering a controversial plan for redevelopment. In 2008, the Newtown Youth Academy began to operate there; extracurricular amenities include a fitness section, basketball courts, and a turf field.

Edmond Town Hall

Constructed in 1930 by a private benefactress for the community, the Town Hall is used for public-private purposes. Offices for the town are located there. The facility also has available for private rental the Alexandria Room for weddings, parties and recitals; and smaller meeting rooms that can be reserved by community groups. A gymnasium is used for community sports events, as well as private parties, and art or craft shows.

The Edmond Town hall is notable for its cinema. The theater shows popular films shortly after they leave mainstream theaters. It is the only $3 film theater in Connecticut. It is a popular spot for middle school and high school students.

The theater has been the primary venue for the Newtown Friends of Music chamber music concerts, the Flagpole Radio Café productions, and several others. The "Live at the Edmond Town Hall" concert series was created by Newtown resident Hayden Bates in 2009. All proceeds are put towards aiding the Edmond's theater upgrades. Headliners have included The Low Anthem, The Bill Frisell and Sam Amidon Duo, Brown Bird and Phosphorescent. In 2014, the theater began showing classic films through the Sunday Cinema Series, later changed to the Someday Cinema Series. A dozen films from 1939 were selected to celebrate The Greatest Year in Film, most sponsored by community members and local businesses, and presented by the Newtown Cultural Arts Commission.

The Board of Managers of the Hall is composed of six members serving six-year terms. At each regular Town Election, two members are elected, who must represent different political parties. According to Town Charter, the Board "shall have the exclusive care and maintenance of Edmond Town Hall and all grounds and buildings appurtenant thereto, together with all powers and duties prescribed for said Board by Special Act No. 98 of the 1931 session by which it was created, as amended by Special Act No. 517 of the 1953 session".

The architect was Philip Sutherland, who also designed Cyrenius H. Booth Library. The Town Hall was constructed for the community by a local benefactress Mary Elizabeth Hawley and dedicated in 1930. The building was named for Miss Hawley’s maternal great-grandfather Judge William Edmond.

Cyrenius H. Booth Library
Newtown's public library was opened December 17, 1932, with a capacity for 25,000 volumes. The library is a posthumous gift of Mary Elizabeth Hawley. She named it for her maternal grandfather, a doctor in town from 1820 until his death in 1871. Hawley's gift paid for construction of the building, and an endowment, a trust fund of about $250,000. As a result, the town did not have to provide any financial support to the library until the 1980s.

Designed by Philip Sutherland, the building was considered one of the most modern libraries of its time, with several innovative features. The building was fireproof, had cork floors and acoustic ceiling tiles to deaden sound, and had a built-in humidifying unit and a centralized vacuum cleaner.

In January 1998 an addition to the rear of the building was completed and officially opened. The expansion doubled the available floor space. It provides areas for meetings and displays of art and local historical artifacts from the library's large collection.

National Register of Historic Places

Caleb Baldwin Tavern – 32 Main Street (added September 23, 2002)
Camps Nos. 10 and 41 of Rochambeau's Army, archeological site on grounds of Hawley School (added June 6, 2002)
Glover House – 50 Main Street (added March 11, 1982)
Hattertown Historic District – Roughly, junction of Aunt Park Lane, Castle Meadow, Hattertown, and Hi Barlow roads (added 1996)
John Glover House – 53 Echo Valley Road (added September 17, 2001)
March Route of Rochambeau's Army: Reservoir Road – Junction of Reservoir Road and Mount Pleasant Road South (added February 8, 2003)
Nathan B. Lattin Farm – 22 Walker Hill Road (added June 24, 1990)
New York Belting and Packing Co. – 45–71 and 79–89 Glen Road (added July 2, 1982)
Newtown Borough Historic District – Roughly, Main Street from Hawley Road to Academy Lane (added 1996)
Nichols Satinet Mill Site (added March 23, 1996)
Sanford–Curtis–Thurber House (added 2007)

Economy

Of the residents of Newtown, especially prior to the rise of remote work that became more prevalent after the COVID-19 pandemic, many commuted for work to Manhattan, Hartford, and Stamford.

Major employers

According to the Newtown Connecticut Economic Development Commission, the top employers in the Newtown and Sandy Hook area are:

Education

The Newtown Public Schools district operates four elementary schools (Hawley Elementary School, Head O'Meadow Elementary School, Middle Gate Elementary School, and Sandy Hook Elementary School) that serve grades K–4, Reed Intermediate School serving grades 5–6, Newtown Middle School serving grades 7–8, and Newtown High School serving grades 9–12.

Newtown also has several private and parochial schools, including St. Rose of Lima Roman Catholic School, the Fraser-Woods Montessori School, and the Housatonic Valley Waldorf School.
In 2010, six educators made the top salary list in Newtown, Connecticut.

Notable people

Renata Adler (born 1938), author
John Ball (born 1972), soccer player
Mary Augustine Barber (1789–1860), educator and Visitandine nun
William Bayer (born 1939), novelist
Cyrus Beers (1786–1850), U.S. Representative from New York
Charles Chapman (1799–1869), U.S. Representative from Connecticut
Suzanne Collins (born 1962), author of the best-selling The Hunger Games book series
Joanna Cole (1944–2020), author of The Magic School Bus series
Robert Cottingham (born 1935), photorealist painter
Bruce Degen (born 1945), illustrator of The Magic School Bus series
Henry Dutton (1796–1869), former Connecticut governor
Edward Eliscu (1902–1998), songwriter
Joseph F. Engelberger (1925–2015), roboticist
Scott Fellows (born 1965), producer and writer of Ned’s Declassified and Big Time Rush
Sawyer Fredericks (born 1999) folk singer notable for winning NBC's The Voice (American season 8), born in Newtown and lived there until age 8, when he moved to Fultonville, New York (near Albany)
Robert Edison Fulton Jr. (1909–2004), inventor and adventurer
Charles Goodyear (1800–1860), inventor of the vulcanization process
Willis Nichols Hawley (1875–1898), American soldier; born and raised in Newtown
Rea Irvin (1881–1972), cartoonist, illustrator, and art editor
Caitlyn Jenner (born 1949), Olympic athlete
Elia Kazan (1909–2003), film and stage director
Steven Kellogg (born 1940), children's author and illustrator, used to live in Sandy Hook, "is believed to have sold house to Anthony Edwards".
Deen Kemsley, accounting professor and Christian author
Doug Kenney, humorist (National Lampoon co-creator, Animal House co-writer)
Chris Licht, CNN President
Burke Marshall (1922–2003), head of the Civil Rights Division of the U.S. Department of Justice during the Civil Rights Era, retired in Newtown
Leah McSweeney (born 1982), founder and CEO of the female "Married to the MOB" (MTTM) clothing line
Daniel Nash Morgan (1844–1931), Treasurer of the United States
Luzon Buritt Morris (1827–1895), 55th Governor of Connecticut
Ryan T. Murphy (born 1971), associate director of the Mormon Tabernacle Choir, was a resident and graduate from Newtown High School
Max Nacewicz (born 1993), professional football player
Elizur H. Prindle (1829–1890), U.S. Representative from New York
Francis Cornwall Sherman (1805–1870), Mayor of Chicago, for three terms for the Democratic Party
Francis Trowbridge Sherman (1825–1905), Union general during the American Civil War
Jesse Lee Soffer (born 1984), actor, TV series As the World Turns and Chicago P.D.
Art Spector (1920–1987), Boston Celtics basketball player
Rick Spencer (singer) (born 1952), American folk singer-songwriter and musical historian
Joey Styles (born 1971), announcer for Extreme Championship Wrestling and World Wrestling Entertainment
James Thurber (1894–1961), cartoonist and playwright
Isaac Toucey (1792–1869), U.S. Senator, Secretary of the Navy, Attorney General of the United States, and Governor of Connecticut, was born in the town
Marcus Tracy (born 1986), professional soccer player
Mead Treadwell (born 1956), 13th Lieutenant Governor of Alaska and former Chair of the U.S. Arctic Research Commission
Walter S. Trumbull (died 1961), sportswriter and columnist
Cecily Tynan (born 1969), broadcast meteorologist, WPVI TV Action News in Philadelphia, PA
Louis Untermeyer (1885–1977), American poet, anthologist and critic who lived and later died here
Jenna Von Oy (born 1977), actress, TV series Blossom and The Parkers
Nina Barr Wheeler (1909–1978), artist, muralist

Notes

References

External links

Town of Newtown official website

 
Towns in Fairfield County, Connecticut
Populated places established in 1705
1705 establishments in Connecticut
Towns in the New York metropolitan area
Towns in Connecticut